The Holocaust was a genocide during World War II in which Nazi Germany, aided by its collaborators, systematically murdered approximately 6 million European Jews.

Holocaust may also refer to:

 Holocaust (sacrifice), an ancient sacrifice or offering from which the name was derived
 Holocaust (band), a Scottish heavy metal band
 Holocaust, a fictional DC Comics character and member of the Blood Syndicate 
 Holocaust (Marvel Comics), a fictional character
 Holocaust (miniseries), a 1978 American television miniseries
 "Holocaust", a song by Big Star from the 1978 album Third/Sister Lovers
 "Holocaust", a song by Bathory from the 1988 album Blood Fire Death
 The Holocaust (album), a 2006 album by Blue Sky Black Death and Warcloud

See also
 Red Holocaust (disambiguation)
 
 Holocausto (disambiguation)
 Names of the Holocaust
 Shoah (disambiguation)